Mete Adanır (14 November 1961 – 20 January 1989) was a Turkish Cypriot football forward who played for clubs in England and Turkey.

Career
Born in Limassol, Cyprus, Adanır began playing youth football for local side Doğan Türk Birliği. He moved to England in September 1979 to pursue higher education. While studying, he joined Leyton Orient F.C.'s youth side. Six months later, he signed with the senior side and began playing with the reserves. However, the club was unable to get clearance from the Cyprus football association and cancelled his registration.

Still living in England, Adanır played in an Arab youth tournament where he was scouted by Turkish Süper Lig club Altay S.K. He joined Altay at the beginning of the 1981-82 season, and would spend four seasons with the club, three of them in the first division.

He moved to second division side Konyaspor, where he would enjoy success. He scored 25 goals during the 1985-86 season and was named the Konya sportsman of the year.

After impressing at Konyaspor, Adanır signed with Süper Lig side Samsunspor in July 1987, where he would make 38 league appearances before his death.

Personal
The Samsunspor team bus was involved in a traffic accident in Havza on the way to a match in Malatya on 20 January 1989, killing the team coach, five players and the bus driver instantly. Adanır was one of the players who died.

References

External links
 Profile at Turksports.net
 

1961 births
1989 deaths
Sportspeople from Limassol
Cypriot footballers
Turkish Cypriot footballers
Altay S.K. footballers
Konyaspor footballers
Samsunspor footballers
Süper Lig players
Road incident deaths in Turkey
Cypriot expatriate footballers
Cypriot expatriates in England
Expatriate footballers in England
Association football forwards
Turkish Cypriot expatriate sportspeople in Turkey
Turkish Cypriot expatriates in the United Kingdom
Turkish Cypriot expatriate sportspeople
Expatriate footballers in Turkey